This list of University of Chicago faculty contains administrators, long-term faculty members, and temporary academic staffs of the University of Chicago. The long-term faculty members consists of tenure/tenure-track and equivalent academic positions, while that of temporary academic staffs consists of lecturers (without tenure), postdoctoral researchers, visiting professors or scholars (visitors), and equivalent academic positions. Summer visitors are also generally excluded from the list (unless summer work yielded significant end products) since summer terms are not part of formal academic years; the same rule applies to the Graham School of Continuing Liberal and Professional Studies, the extension school of the university.

Business

Graduate Library School (1928–1989)
Lester Asheim
Lee Pierce Butler
Leon Carnovsky
Herman H. Fussler
Frances E. Henne
Carleton B. Joeckel
Jesse Shera
Don R. Swanson
Peggy Sullivan
Douglas Waples
Louis Round Wilson
Victor Yngve

This school, established with funding from the Carnegie Foundation, so important to the development of U.S. librarianship in the 20th century, was closed in 1989. For details see: Graduate Library School, University of Chicago, 1928-1989.

Literature
 Frederick A. de Armas – Andrew W. Mellon Professor in Humanities and professor of Spanish and comparative literature; chair of the Department of Romance Languages and Literatures
 Saul Bellow (X. 1939) – former Raymond W. and Martha Hilpert Gruner Distinguished Service Professor in the Committee on Social Thought and English; winner of the Pulitzer Prize and the Nobel Prize in Literature
 Lauren Berlant – George M. Pullman Professor of English
 David Bevington – editor, scholar of the work of William Shakespeare
 Homi K. Bhabha – former professor of English
 Allan Bloom – author of The Closing of the American Mind; former professor in the Committee on Social Thought
 Wayne C. Booth – George M. Pullman Distinguished Service Professor Emeritus
 Kenneth Burke – philosophy, aesthetics, criticism and rhetorical literary theorist
 Chicago School of literary criticism – group of faculty members at the University of Chicago (R.S. Crane, Elder Olson, Wayne Booth) who founded neo-Aristotelianism
 John Maxwell Coetzee – 2003 Nobel Prize laureate in Literature; distinguished professor in the Committee on Social Thought
 Anna Crone – linguist and literary theorist on Slavic languages
 T.S. Eliot – influential poet, dramatist and literary critic; member of the University of Chicago's Committee on Social Thought
 Ralph Ellison – National Book Award winner for Invisible Man
 Leela Gandhi – postcolonial theorist and British English professor
 Gerald Graff (A.B. 1959) – former professor of English and Education
 Daryl Hine – poet and translator; MacArthur Fellow in 1986
 James R. Lawler – Edward Carson Waller Distinguished Service Professor in Romance Languages and Literatures (1979–97)
 Norman Maclean – author of A River Runs Through It
 Thomas Pavel – Gordon J. Laing Distinguished Service Professor in the Committee on Social Thought and the Departments of Romance Languages and Comparative Literature
 Robert Pinsky – poet-critic; former assistant professor of the humanities
 A.K. Ramanujan – poet and scholar of Indian literature; MacArthur Fellow in 1983
 Theodore Silverstein - scholar of medieval literature and poetry
 Mark Strand – former professor in the Committee on Social Thought; Pulitzer Prize winner
 David E. Wellbery – chair of the department of Germanic Studies 
 Thornton Wilder – professor (1930–1937); winner of the National Book Award, and the Presidential Medal of Freedom, and three-time winner of the Pulitzer Prize
 Eleanor Wilner – poet 
 A.B. Yehoshua – Israeli novelist, essayist, and playwright
 Adam Zagajewski – member of the Committee on Social Thought

Law School
 Douglas Baird – former dean of the Law School
 Gerhard Casper – former dean of the Law School and Provost at the University of Chicago; President Emeritus of Stanford University
 Ronald Coase – professor emeritus of law; Nobel laureate in Economics; co-founder of law and economics movement, arguably the most influential intellectual movement in legal scholarship in the second half of the 20th century
 Aaron Director – played a central role in the development of the law and economics movement; founded the Journal of Law and Economics, which he co-edited with Ronald Coase
 Frank Easterbrook – judge on the 7th Circuit Court of Appeals
 Richard Epstein – currently the James Parker Hall Distinguished Service Professor of Law
 Richard H. Helmholz – legal historian
 Elena Kagan – former professor and dean of Harvard Law School; now a US Supreme Court Justice
 Karl Llewellyn – major figure in the school of legal realism
 Michael W. McConnell – federal judge on the US Court of Appeals for the Tenth Circuit; leading constitutional originalist
 Martha Nussbaum – philosopher and public intellectual, currently Ernst Freund Distinguished Service Professor of Law and Ethics
 Barack Obama – President of the United States of America
 Richard Posner –  jurist and economist; United States circuit judge of the United States Court of Appeals for the Seventh Circuit and a senior lecturer at the University of Chicago Law School
 Roberta Cooper Ramo – first woman president, American Bar Association
 Antonin Scalia – United States Supreme Court justice; professor at the Law School (1977–1982)
 Michael H. Schill – president of the University of Oregon, former dean and the Harry N. Wyatt Professor of Law Emeritus at the University of Chicago Law School
 Geoffrey R. Stone – First Amendment scholar, Edward H. Levi Distinguished Service Professor of Law
 Cass Sunstein – Legal scholar, particularly in the fields of constitutional law, administrative law, environmental law, and law and behavioral economics.
 James Boyd White – founder of "Law and Literature" movement
 Diane Wood – judge on the 7th Circuit Court of Appeals

Oriental Institute

 Miguel Civil – professor emeritus of Sumerology
 Fred Donner – professor of Islamic history
 Peter Dorman – professor emeritus of Egyptology
 Norman Golb – Ludwig Rosenberger Professor in Jewish History and Civilization
 Janet Johnson – professor of Egyptology
 Walter Kaegi – professor of Byzantine-Islamic Studies
 Robert K. Ritner – professor of Egyptology
 Martha Roth – professor of Assyriology; editor, Chicago Assyrian Dictionary
 Gil Stein – director, Oriental Institute
 Matthew Stolper – professor of Assyriology and Achaemenid Empire; director of Persepolis Fortification Project; member of the American Institute of Iranian Studies, American Oriental Society, and British School of Archaeology in Iraq
 Edward F. Wente – professor emeritus of Egyptology
 K. Aslihan Yener – professor of ancient Anatolian archeology; director of the Amuq Valley Regional Projects in Antioch (Antakya, Turkey)

Mathematics
 Abraham Adrian Albert
 László Babai – known for work in computer science and discrete mathematics, especially for his work on interactive proof systems; Gödel Prize winner
 Walter Lewis Baily, Jr. – known for work in algebraic geometry, Baily-Borel compactification.
 Alexander A. Beilinson
 Gilbert Ames Bliss
 Oskar Bolza
 Luis Caffarelli – world leader in the field of partial differential equations
 Alberto Calderón – co-founded the Chicago school of mathematical analysis; winner of Bôcher Memorial Prize, the Wolf Prize, and the National Medal of Science
 Ngô Bảo Châu – Fields Medal winner
 Shiing-shen Chern – one of the most influential figures in differential geometry; famous for Chern classes; National Medal of Science and Wolf Prize winner
 Arthur Byron Coble
 Leonard Eugene Dickson – first recipient of the Cole Prize in algebra
 Vladimir Drinfeld – Fields Medal winner
 Charles Fefferman – received full professorship at the University of Chicago at age 22, making him the youngest ever appointed in the United States; Fields Medal winner
 Victor Ginzburg – known for his works in geometric representation theory
 George Glauberman
 Paul Halmos – mathematician and mathematical expositor
 Israel Herstein
 Lars Hörmander – Fields Medal winner
 Irving Kaplansky
 John L. Kelley
 Serge Lang
 Greg Lawler
 William Lawvere – known for his work in category theory, topos theory, and the philosophy of mathematics
 Saunders Mac Lane – co-founder of category theory
 J. Peter May – algebraic topologist
 Paul Meier – statistician, promoter of randomized trials in medicine
 E. H. Moore 
 Robert Lee Moore 
 Andrei Okounkov – former Dickson Instructor in Mathematics and the college; Fields Medal winner
 David Pingree – MacArthur Fellow in 1981
 Daniel Quillen – former Dickson Instructor in Mathematics and the college; Fields Medal winner
 Alexander Razborov – Andrew MacLeish Distinguished Service Professor in the Department of Computer Science
 Paul Sally – mathematics educator
 Irving Segal
 Stephen Smale – Fields Medal and Wolf Prize winner
 Robert Soare – known for work in mathematical logic
 Norman Steenrod – topologist
 Marshall Stone
 Karen Uhlenbeck – MacArthur Fellow in 1983
 André Weil – known for seminal work in number theory and algebraic geometry; leader of influential Bourbaki group; Wolf Prize winner
 Efim Zelmanov – Fields Medal winner
 Antoni Zygmund – one of the most influential mathematicians in the field of analysis in the 20th century; co-founder, with student Calderón, of the Chicago school of mathematical analysis

History
 Muzaffar Alam – George V. Bobrinskoy Professor in South Asian Languages and Civilizations
 Robert Bartlett – professor of medieval history (1984–1992), and currently Wardlaw Professor of Mediaeval History, University of St. Andrew's; Fellow of the Royal Historical Society and author of many books, including The Making of Europe: Conquest, Colonization, and Social Change (Princeton University Press, 1994)
 Daniel Boorstin – professor at the University of Chicago for 25 years; Pulitzer Prize winner (1974); Librarian of Congress
 John W. Boyer – dean of the college and the Martin A. Ryerson Distinguished Service Professor of History
 James Henry Breasted – professor of Egyptology and Oriental history
 John Leonard Clive– historian, winner of the National Book Award for Biography and History
 Herrlee G. Creel (Ph.B. 1926, A.M. 1927, Ph.D. 1929) – sinologist 
 Ioan P. Culianu – historian of religion
 Bruce Cumings – Gustavus F. and Ann M. Swift Distinguished Service Professor in History and the college
 Lorraine Daston – visiting professor in the Committee on Social Thought
 Shannon Lee Dawdy – associate professor, MacArthur Fellow
 Fred M. Donner – professor of Near Eastern history; Guggenheim Fellow (2007)
 Stanley Elkins – American historian, best known for his influential, yet controversial, comparison of slavery in the United States to Nazi concentration camps
 Sheila Fitzpatrick – Bernadotte E. Schmitt Distinguished Service Professor of History; historian of modern Russian and Soviet history 
 Cornell Fleischer – Kanuni Suleyman Professor of Ottoman and Modern Turkish Studies; MacArthur "Genius" Fellow (1988)
 John Hope Franklin – pioneering scholar of African-American history; civil rights leader; professor of history from 1964; John Matthews Manly Distinguished Service Professor, 1969–82; resident of the American Historical Association (1979); winner of the Presidential Medal of Freedom and the Pulitzer Prize
 Ramón A. Gutiérrez – Preston & Sterling Morton Distinguished Service Professor of United States History; director of the Center for the Study of Race, Politics and Culture; author of award-winning book When Jesus Came the Corn Mothers Went Away: Marriage, Sexuality and Power in New Mexico, 1500–1846 (Stanford:  Stanford University Press, 1991); MacArthur Fellow (1983)
 Jan E. Goldstein – intellectual historian of modern Europe, co-editor of the Journal of Modern History
 Gustave E. von Grunebaum – historian and Arabist
 Neil Harris – historian, former director of the National Humanities Institute and chairman of the American Council of Learned Societies
 Marshall G. S. Hodgson – pioneer in Islamic Studies and global history, member of the Committee on Social Thought
 Thomas C. Holt – James Westfall Thompson Professor of American and African American History; MacArthur Fellow in 1990
 Akira Iriye – professor of history until 1989; now Charles Warren Professor Emeritus of American History at Harvard; leading diplomatic and international historian, specializing in U.S.-Japan relations during the 20th century; Guggenheim Fellow (1974) and president of the American Historical Association (1988)
 Walter Kaegi – professor of Byzantine and late Roman history; co-founder of the Byzantine Studies Conference; editor of the Byzantinische Forschungen journal; voting member of Oriental Institute, Chicago; author of many books, including Byzantium and the Decline of Rome (Princeton, 1968) and "Byzantine Military Unrest 471–843: An Interpretation (Amsterdam: 1981)
 Leszek Kołakowski – philosopher and historian of ideas; MacArthur Fellow in 1983
 William Hardy McNeill – Professor Emeritus of History
 Eric McKitrick – American historian, recipient of the 1994 Bancroft Prize
 Arnaldo Momigliano – historiographer; MacArthur Fellow in 1987
 David Nirenberg – Deborah R. and Edgar D. Jannotta Professor of Medieval History and Committee on Social Thought
 Ada Palmer - Associate Professor of Early Modern European History and the College, author of the Terra Ignota series
 Francesca Rochberg – Assyriologist, historian of science
 Hans Rothfels – professor of history (1946–1951)
 Bernadotte E. Schmitt – winner of the Pulitzer Prize
 Noel Swerdlow – winner of a Macarthur Fellowship
 James Westfall Thompson – professor of history (1895–1933), leading American historian of the European Middle Ages and early modern period; president of the American Historical Association, 1941 (died in office)
 Karl Weintraub – professor of history (1954–2004) and leading scholar of European cultural history and the history of autobiography
 John Woods – professor of Iranian and Central Asian history

Classics
 Danielle Allen – Dean of the Division of Humanities; MacArthur Fellow
 Clifford Ando – professor of Roman Empire history; author of Imperial Ideology and Provincial Loyalty in the Roman Empire  (2000) (which won APA's Goodwin Award in 2003), and The Matter of the Gods (2008); editor of Roman Religion (2003) and co-editor, with Jörg Rüpke, of Religion and Law in Classical and Christian Rome (2006)
 Shadi Bartsch – professor of gender issues in antiquity and in Roman literature and culture; Quantrell Teaching Award and Faculty Award for Excellence in Graduate Teaching
 Jonathan M. Hall – professor of Greek history; chair of Classics Department; author of Ethnic Identity in Greek Antiquity (Cambridge, 1997); APA's Goodwin Award; 2004 Gordon J. Laing Prize; Quantrell Teaching Award; Phyllis Fay Horton Distinguished Service
 Amy Judith Kass (née Apfel) – professor of classic texts in the College of the University of Chicago
 James M. Redfield – Edward Olson Distinguished Service Professor of Classics
 Peter White – professor of Roman poetry, comedy and satire and Greco-Roman historiography; Associate Chair for Undergraduate Affairs; author of Promised Verse: Poets in the Society of Augustan Rome; APA's Goodwin Award; Quantrell Teaching Award

Philosophy
 Hannah Arendt – former professor in the Committee on Social Thought
 Rudolf Carnap – professor of philosophy; leading member of the Vienna Circle
 Stanley Cavell – visiting lecturer on philosophy
 Arnold Davidson – professor of the Philosophy of Religion in the Divinity School; also in the Department of Philosophy, the Department of Comparative Literature, the Committee on Historical and Conceptual Studies of Science, and the college
 Donald Davidson – professor of philosophy (1976–1981)
 John Dewey – former professor of philosophy
 Burton Dreben – logician, became an instructor in 1955
 Charles Hartshorne – former professor of philosophy
 John Haugeland – David B. and Clara E. Stern Professor of Philosophy
 Anthony Kenny – visiting professor of philosophy
 Charles Larmore – Chester D. Tripp Professor and the Raymond W. & Martha Hilpert Gruner Distinguished Service Professor
 Jonathan Lear – John U. Nef Distinguished Service Professor at the Committee on Social Thought and in the Department of Philosophy
 Jean-Luc Marion – professor of the Philosophy of Religion and Theology in the Divinity School; also in the Department of Philosophy and the Committee on Social Thought
 George Herbert Mead – former professor of philosophy
 Martha Nussbaum – Ernst Freund Distinguished Service Professor of Law and Ethics in the Divinity School; also in the Law School, the Department of Philosophy, and the college
 Robert B. Pippin – Evelyn Stefansson Nef Distinguished Service Professor in the John U. Nef Committee on Social Thought, the Department of Philosophy, and the college
 Paul Ricoeur – John Nuveen Professor Emeritus in the Divinity School (1971–1991)
 Bertrand Russell – visiting professor of philosophy (1938–1939)
 Howard Stein – philosopher and historian of science
 Leo Strauss – professor of political philosophy (1949–1967)
 Paul Johannes Tillich – professor of religion (1962)
 James Hayden Tufts – former professor of philosophy

Religion
 Richard T. Antoun – professor (1989); professor emeritus of anthropology at Binghamton University; stabbed to death by student in 2009
 J. A. B. van Buitenen – George V. Bobrinskoy Professor of Sanskrit in the Department of South Asian Languages and Civilizations
 Wendy Doniger – Historian of Religions (1978– )
 Mircea Eliade – Sewell Avery Distinguished Service Professor of the History of Religions (1958–1986), best known for his "myth of the Eternal Return" and his book The Sacred and the Profane: The Nature of Religion
 Joseph Kitagawa – historian of religions
 Hans Küng – Catholic priest, theologian, and author
 Bruce Lincoln – historian of religions
 Martin Marty
 Frank Reynolds
 David Tracy – professor emeritus of theology (1970–); leading figure in theological hermeneutics and proponent of theological pluralism in works such as Plurality and Ambiguity (University of Chicago Press, 1986)
 Joachim Wach – historian of religions (1944–55)
 Christian K. Wedemeyer – associate professor of the history of religions; MacArthur Fellow in 1987

Science
 Warder Clyde Allee – ecologist and professor of zoology
 Zonia Baber – geographer and geologist
 Myrtle Bachelder – chemist and Women's Army Corps officer; noted for her secret work on the Manhattan Project atomic bomb program, and for the development of techniques in the chemistry of metals
 Ralph Buchsbaum – invertebrate zoologist
 R. Stephen Berry – physical chemist; MacArthur Fellow in 1983
 John T. Cacioppo – biological psychologist,  Tiffany and Margaret Blake Distinguished Service Professor
 Marcela Carena – particle physicist
 John Carlstrom – astrophysicist; MacArthur Fellow
 Sean M. Carroll – cosmologist
 Thomas Chrowder Chamberlin – geologist; developed planetesimal theory
 Subrahmanyan Chandrasekhar – 1983 Nobel Prize laureate in Physics
 Fay-Cooper Cole – witness at the Scopes Monkey Trial
 Arthur Compton – physicist who discovered the Compton effect and oversaw the Manhattan Project 
 Jerry Coyne – professor emeritus; specialist in speciation and evolutionary genetics
 Andrew M. Davis – professor of astronomy and geophysical sciences; developed resonant ionization mass spectrometry
 Savas Dimopoulos – particle physicist
 Michael Dickinson – bioengineer and neuroscientist
 Enrico Fermi – 1938 Nobel Prize laureate in Physics
 James Franck – Nobel laureate
 Karl Freed – physical chemist
 Daniel Friedan – theoretical physicist; MacArthur Fellow in 1987
 T. Theodore Fujita – atmospheric scientist and renowned tornado expert; developer of Fujita scale
 Murray Gell-Mann – 1969 Nobel Prize in Physics
 Henry A. Gleason –  ecologist, botanist, and taxonomist
 Maria Goeppert-Mayer – developed model for nuclear shell structure at the University of Chicago, for which she received a Nobel in Physics in 1963
 George Ellery Hale – solar astronomer, best known for his discovery of magnetic fields in sunspots
 James Hartle – theoretical physicist at the Enrico Fermi Institute
 Ronald Wilbert Harris – professor of physics and department chair, astronomer, photographer
 Chuan He – professor of chemistry; chemical biologist
 Gerhard Herzberg – 1971 Nobel Prize laureate in Chemistry
 Edwin Hubble – astronomer, observational cosmologist
 Clyde A. Hutchison Jr. - physical chemist
 Ole J. Kleppa – pioneer in high temperature thermochemistry; inventor of the Kleppa Calorimeter
 Edward W. Kolb – cosmologist
 Martin Kreitman – geneticist; MacArthur Fellow in 1991
 Bruce Lahn – professor of human genetics
 Ernest Lawrence – 1939 Nobel Prize laureate in Physics
 Richard Lewontin – pioneered use of molecular biology on questions of evolution and genetic variation
 Albert J. Libchaber – physicist; recipient of Wolf Prize in Physics in 1986; MacArthur Fellow in 1986
 Frank Rattray Lillie – embryologist and zoologist
 Joseph Lykken – particle physicist
 Joseph Edward Mayer – physical chemist
 Martha McClintock – biological psychologist
 Albert A. Michelson – first American Nobel laureate in the sciences; known for the Michelson-Morley experiment, a cornerstone of relativity theory; measured the speed of light
 Robert Millikan – Nobel laureate in Physics; known for his measurement of the charge of the electron and the photoelectric effect; performed famed oil-drop experiment at the University of Chicago's Ryerson Laboratory, which has been designated a historic physics landmark by the American Physical Society
 Robert S. Mulliken – 1966 Nobel Prize in Chemistry; 1983 Priestley Medal
 John Keith Moffat – Louis Block Professor in Biochemistry, Molecular, and Cell Biology; former Deputy Provost for Research; and Guggenheim Fellow noted for Time resolved crystallography
 Yoichiro Nambu – winner of Sakurai Prize, Wolf Prize, Nobel Prize in Physics, and the National Medal of Science; considered founder of string theory; known for "color charge" in quantum chromodynamics and work on spontaneous symmetry breaking in particle physics
 C. Robert O'Dell – astrophysicist, Project Scientist for Hubble Space Telescope
 
 Eugene Parker – astrophysicist, known for his work on the solar wind
 Stuart Rice – chemist; National Medal of Science winner
 Howard Taylor Ricketts – pathologist 
 Bernard Roizman – virologist, member of the National Academy of Sciences
Clemens C. J. Roothaan – physicist and chemist
 Lanny D. Schmidt - Inventor and researcher, member of the National Academy of Engineering
 Florence B. Seibert – biochemist, winner of the Garvan–Olin Medal; member of the National Women's Hall of Fame
 Stephen Shenker – theoretical physicist, string theorist; MacArthur Fellow in 1987
 Paul Sigler – former professor; worked out the structure of the RNA molecule responsible for the initiation of protein synthesis
 Maria Spiropulu – particle physicist
 Otto Struve – astronomer
 Lucy Graves Taliaferro - parasitologist
 Edward Teller – "Father of the hydrogen bomb"
 Michael S. Turner – cosmologist
 Russell Tuttle – primate morphologist
 Harold Urey – Nobel Prize in Chemistry
Robert M. Wald – gravitational physicist
 Carlos E.M. Wagner – particle physicist
 Frank Wilczek – theoretical physicist, mathematician; 2004 Nobel Prize laureate
 Sewall Wright – National Medal of Science winner; one of the founders of population genetics
 Ian Foster - computer scientist, pioneer of Grid Computing

Medicine and health policy
Susan L. Cohn – professor of pediatrics and dean for clinical research
Raphael Carl Lee – surgeon, medical researcher, biomedical engineer; MacArthur Fellow in 1981
 Nathaniel Kleitman – physiologist and sleep researcher, recognized as the father of modern sleep research
 Harold Pollack – professor and chair of the Center for Health Administration Studies
 Mark Siegler – director of the MacLean Center for Clinical Medical Ethics
 Daniel Sulmasy – medical ethicist
 Olufunmilayo Olopade – Distinguished Service Professor in Medicine and Human genetics; MacArthur Fellow

Social sciences
 James A. Robinson – The Reverend Dr. Richard L. Pearson Professor of Global Conflict Studies and University Professor at Harris School of Public Policy
 Arjun Appadurai (A.M. 1973, Ph.D. 1976) – former professor of anthropology
 Gary Becker (A.M. 1953, Ph.D. 1955) – University Professor in Economics, Graduate School of Business, and Sociology
 Katherine Baicker – Health economist, Dean and Emmett Dedmon Professor at Harris School of Public Policy
 Chris Blattman – economist, political scientist, member of the Pearson Institute
 Leonard Bloomfield – linguist who led the development of structural linguistics
 Donald Bogue (A.M., Ph.D.) – current professor of sociology at the University of Chicago
 Dipesh Chakrabarty – Lawrence A. Kimpton Distinguished Service Professor in History and South Asian Languages & Civilizations
 Ronald Coase – Clifton R. Musser Professor Emeritus of Economics, The Law School
 Constantin Fasolt – professor of Early Modern European history
 Robert Fogel – Charles R. Walgreen Distinguished Service Professor of American Institutions
 John Hope Franklin – John Matthews Manly Distinguished Service Professor Emeritus in History
 Milton Friedman – Paul Snowden Russell Distinguished Service Professor Emeritus in Economics
 Susan Gal – Mae & Sidney G. Metzl Distinguished Service Professor of Anthropology and Linguistics; leading scholar in studies of Eastern Europe, linguistic anthropology, and gender
 Clifford Geertz – professor of anthropology (1960–1970)
 Matthew Gentzkow – Richard O. Ryan Professor of Economics and Neubauer Family Faculty Fellow
 Susan Goldin-Meadow – Beardsley Ruml Distinguished Service Professor in the Departments of Psychology, Comparative Human Development, the college, and the Committee on Education
 Chauncy Harris – pioneering geographer at the University of Chicago in the first department of geography in the United States
 Friedrich Hayek – former professor in the Committee on Social Thought
 James Heckman – winner of the Nobel Memorial Prize in Economics in 2000
 Hans Joas – visiting professor of sociology and social thought and a member of the Committee on Social Thought at the University of Chicago
 Morton A. Kaplan – professor of political science
 Evelyn M. Kitagawa (B.A. 1941, Ph.D. 1951) – professor of sociology
 Karin Knorr-Cetina – George Wells Beadle Distinguished Service Professor of Anthropology and Sociology
 Lawrence Kohlberg (A.B. 1949, Ph.D. 1958) – professor in the Committee on Human Development (1962–1968)
 Maynard C. Krueger – socialist vice-presidential candidate and professor of economics 1933? – ??
 Harold Lasswell – one of the most influential political scientists of the 20th century
 Karl Lashley – gestaltist psychologist
 Steven Levitt – Alvin H. Baum Professor in Economics
 Mark Lilla – professor in the Committee on Social Thought (1999–2007)
 John A. List – economist, pioneer in the field of experimental economics
 Robert Lucas Jr. (A.B. 1959, Ph.D. 1964) – John Dewey Distinguished Service Professor in Economics
 Jacob Marschak – economist, leader of the Cowles Commission
 Raven I. McDavid, Jr. – linguist, dialectologist
 John Mearsheimer – R. Wendell Harrison Distinguished Service Professor of Political Science
 Charles Edward Merriam – founder of the behavioral approach to political science
 Merton H. Miller – Robert R. McCormick Distinguished Service Professor Emeritus, Graduate School of Business
 Hans Morgenthau – international relations theorist; his book Politics Among Nations defined the international relations field
 Robert Pape (Ph.D. 1988) – professor of political science
 Vivian Paley – early childhood education researcher; MacArthur Fellow in 1989
 Robert E. Park – professor of sociology (1914–1936)
 Henry Paulson – fellow at the Harris School of Public Policy Studies and the chairman of the Paulson Institute; 74th United States Secretary of the Treasury
 William R. Polk – established the Center for Middle Eastern Studies, serving as Founding Director
 Kenneth Prewitt – director of the Census Bureau from 1998 to 2001, appointed assistant professor in 1965
 Alfred Radcliffe-Brown – professor of anthropology (1931–1937); developed theory of Structural Functionalism
 Robert Redfield – professor of anthropology (1927–1958)
Albert Rees – former University of Chicago and Princeton University economics professor, former Provost at Princeton, advisor to President Gerald Ford
 Carl Rogers  – one of the founders of humanistic psychology
 Marshall Sahlins – Charles F. Grey Distinguished Service Professor Emeritus of Anthropology
 Edward Sapir – creator of the Sapir–Whorf hypothesis, arguably the most influential figure in American linguistics
 Saskia Sassen – Ralph Lewis Professor of Sociology (1998–2007)
 David M. Schneider – professor of anthropology (1960–1986)
 Michael Schudson – journalism expert (1976–1980)
 Richard Shweder – Harold H. Swift Distinguished Service Professor of Human Development in the Department of Comparative Human Development
 Michael Silverstein – Charles F. Grey Distinguished Service Professor of anthropology, linguistics, and psychology; MacArthur Fellow in 1982
 Theda Skocpol – former professor of sociology (1981–1986); now Dean of Graduate School of Arts and Sciences at Harvard
 George Stigler – Charles R. Walgreen Distinguished Service Professor in Economics and Graduate School of Business
 Stanley Jeyaraja Tambiah – specialised in studies of Thailand, Sri Lanka, and Tamils, as well as the anthropology of religion and politics
 William I. Thomas (Ph.D. 1896) – professor of sociology (1896–1918)
 Frederic Thrasher – sociologist and prominent member of the Chicago School of Sociology
 Victor Turner – former professor in the Committee on Social Thought
 Thorstein Veblen – professor of political economy (1892–1906)
 Stephen Walt – former professor (1989–1999) and deputy dean of social sciences (1996–1999); dean of Harvard's John F. Kennedy School of Government after tenure at the University of Chicago
 Naomi Weisstein – professor of psychology; Guggenheim fellow
 William Julius Wilson – Lucy Flower University Professor of Sociology (1972–1996)
 Albert Wohlstetter – awarded Presidential Medal of Freedom; influenced prominent neoconservatives, including Paul Wolfowitz; prominent theorist of the Cold War
 Dali Yang – William Claude Reavis Professor in the Department of Political Science, Faculty Director of the University of Chicago Center in Beijing
 Theodore O. Yntema (Ph.D. 1929) – economist, director of the Cowles Commission
 Iris Marion Young – former professor of political science
 Raghuram Rajan - Katherine Dusak Miller Distinguished Service Professor of Finance at the Booth School of Business, Former Chief Economist at the International Monetary Fund, Former Governor of the Reserve Bank of India and former Chief Economic Advisor to the Prime Minister of India. Author of Saving Capitalism from the Capitalists with Luigi Zingales, Fault Lines, I Do What i Do and The Third Pillar

Arts and entertainment
 Walter Blair – English professor
 Jan Chiapusso – piano pedagogue
 John Eaton – composer; MacArthur Fellow in 1990
 Roger Ebert (X. 1970) – film critic and lecturer at Graham School; winner of the Pulitzer Prize
 Cécile Fromont – art historian
 Philip Gossett – musicologist and scholar of 19th-century Italian opera
 Iñigo Manglano-Ovalle – MacArthur Fellow in 2001
 Shulamit Ran – William H. Colvin Professor of Music, 1973–present; winner of the Pulitzer Prize; student of Ralph Shapey
 Ralph Shapey – composer; MacArthur Fellow in 1982
 Jacqueline Stewart – film history
 Jessica Stockholder – sculptor, Arts Department Chair

University Presidents

Notes

References 

Lists of people by university or college in Illinois
Lists of scholars and academics
University of Chicago faculty